The Saint-Pierre Cemetery (French: "Cimetière Saint-Pierre") is a cemetery in Aix-en-Provence. It is home to the burials of many renowned painters and sculptors.

Location
It is located on the Avenue Des Déportés de la Résistance Aixoise in Aix-en-Provence. It is opposite the Stade Georges Carcassonne, a sports stadium.

History
It was established in 1824. It was built upon two former private, adjacacent cemeteries: a Jewish one and a Protestant one. It spans seven hectares.

Notable burials
 Jean Amado (1922–1995), sculptor.
 Henri Brémond (1865–1933), Jesuit author
 Paul Cézanne (1839–1906), painter.
 Jean-Antoine Constantin (1744–1844), painter
 Achille Empéraire (1829–1898), painter
 Hippolyte Ferrat (1822–1882), sculptor
 Louis Nicolas Philippe Auguste de Forbin (1779–1841), painter
 Jean-Baptiste Gaut (1819–1891), author
 Louis Gautier (1855–1947), painter
 René Génin (1890–1967), actor
 Louise Germain (1874–1939), painter
 Victor Leydet (1845–1908), politician
 François Mignet (1796–1884), historian
 Darius Milhaud (1892–1974), composer.
 Sextius Alexandre François de Miollis (1759–1828), military general
 Agricol Moureau (1766–1842), Sans-culotte
 Jean Murat (1888–1968), comedian
 Barthélémy Niollon (1849–1927), painter
 Joseph Ravaisou (1865–1925), painter
 John Rewald (1912–1994).
 Henri Émilien Rousseau (1875–1933), painter
 Philippe Solari (1840–1906), sculptor
 François Vidal (1832–1911), Félibrige activist, poet
 Joseph Villevieille (1829–1916), painter
 François Zola (1796–1847), dam-builder and father of Émile Zola.

References

1824 establishments in France
Buildings and structures in Aix-en-Provence
Cemeteries in France